Kannedhirey Thondrinal is a 1998 Indian Tamil-language romantic drama film directed by Ravichandran. The film stars Prashanth and Simran. The film's score and soundtrack were composed by Deva. The film's success later led to remakes in other languages as well.

Plot

Vasanth is the son of a prominent industrialist in Coimbatore. He enrolls in an engineering college in Chennai, where he butts heads with Shankar, a short-tempered and somewhat violent senior. Their animosity persists, but after Vasanth helps Shankar fight off a bunch of ruffians, they become best friends. Vasanth proves to be a calming influence on Shankar, who is impressed by Vasanth's humility, in spite of his vast wealth.

Shankar's family is something of a puzzle to Vasanth: upon receiving an invite to Shankar's house, Vasanth overhears Shankar's mother asking him why he invited visitors over. The cold reception upsets Vasanth, who makes up an excuse to leave to an embarrassed Shankar. In due course, Shankar's mother understands Vasanth's good nature and becomes very affectionate towards him.

In a side story, Vasanth chances upon a girl in the Coimbatore railway station one day. Smitten, he chases her and while she seems disinterested, he persists in his affections, eventually landing up in jail for eve-teasing after a misunderstanding with the police relating to their relationship, which she doesn't attempt to clear. The twist - the girl is revealed to be Priya, Shankar's younger sister, who in the face of Vasanth's decency upon his release - he doesn't reveal anything about her role in his imprisonment to Shankar or his mother, and withdraws from her life - discovers that she loves him too. They make up, but before they announce their love to their families, Shankar tells Vasanth about an act of treachery committed by one of his closest friends against his family.

The flashback is revealed. Shankar's family has one more member not mentioned thus far - another sister Shanthi. There are happy scenes where Shankar, his friends and his mother prepare for her wedding. Of his friends, there is a particularly close one - Shakthi, who much like Vasanth today was Shankar's best friend at the time. Tragedy strikes when Shankar and his mother find that his sister had fled from the wedding hall, and they try to find her, encountering several humiliations along the way - from the groom's family and the police. Finally, they see an auto rickshaw, where his sister emerges from, and to his shock, Shakthi is with her. It turns out Shanthi had run off to marry Shakthi, which leaves Shankar and his mother broken-hearted. In their hurt and rage, they disown Shanthi, and become much more guarded with their interactions with Shankar's friends, explaining Shankar's mother's initial reaction towards Vasanth.

Seeing parallels between that story and his own, a shaken Vasanth resolves not to let love come before his friendship. Priya, on the other hand, is unwilling to let go, and requests him on repeated occasions to accept her love, to no avail. Her family prepares to arrange for her wedding, and increasingly desperate, she consumes poison and is taken to the hospital. Vasanth's friend Boopalan, who believes enough is enough, tells Shankar and his family about Vasanth and Priya's love for each other, and how Vasanth, for the sake of his friendship with Shankar, had sacrificed his love. An emotional Shankar tells Vasanth that he is proud of their friendship, and gives his approval for Vasanth and Priya's marriage.

Cast

 Prashanth as Vasanth
 Simran as Priya
 Karan as Shankar, Priya's brother and Vasanth's best friend
 Vivek
 Vignesh as Shakthi (guest appearance)
 Rathan as Vasanth's father (Guest Appearance)
 Ramji as Ram
 Srividya as Shankar & Priya's mother
 Chinni Jayanth as Boopalan
 Vaiyapuri as Jambu
 Thalapathi Dinesh as Inspector
 Indhu as Shanthi

Soundtrack

The film score and the soundtrack were composed by Deva. The music album, released in 1998, featuring 7 tracks was highly popular. The song "Salomia" is inspired by the Pakistani song "Saiyoni"

Release
The film opened with positive critical reception upon release. Kannedhirey Thondrinal also performed well at the Tamil Nadu box office. Owing to its success, the film was remade in Telugu as Manasulo Maata (1998), in Kannada as Snehaloka (1999), in Malayalam as Dhosth (2001), in Bengali as Sangee (2002), and also in Bangladesh as Tumi Koto Sundar (2006). After their first film, Prashanth and Simran went on to pair together in the future projects, Jodi (1999), Parthen Rasithen (2000) and Thamizh (2002). All these turned out to be Blockbusters.

References

External links
 

1998 films
Tamil films remade in other languages
Indian buddy films
Indian romantic drama films
Films scored by Deva (composer)
1990s Tamil-language films
Films shot in Goa
Films shot in Chennai
1998 directorial debut films
1998 romantic drama films